Club Baloncesto Agustinos Eras, also known as Agustinos Leclerc by sponsorship reasons, is a basketball club based in León, Castile and León that currently plays in LEB Plata, the third tier of Spanish basketball.

History
Agustinos Eras was founded in 2007 as a merge of two schools of León (Colegio Agustinos and IES Eras de Renueva) and starts being an affiliated team of Baloncesto León.

In 2010 the club separates from Baloncesto León and two years later joins the Primera División (fifth tier). The club promoted to Liga EBA in its first attempt, in 2013, by winning the Primera División group of Castile of León and finishing as runner-up in the promotion playoffs.

Since its debut in EBA, the club always qualified to the promotion playoffs to LEB Plata, but never achieved its target. In July 2016, after its third attempt, Agustinos Eras achieved a vacant berth to play in this league. For its first season as a professional club, Ángel Jareño, former manager of Baloncesto León, was appointed to be the head coach of the team.

Sponsorship naming
Agustinos Eras E.Leclerc 2013–2014
Agustinos Leclerc 2014–

Season by season

References

External links
Club website

Basketball teams in Castile and León
Basketball teams established in 2007
2007 establishments in Spain
Former Liga EBA teams
Former LEB Plata teams
Sport in León, Spain